Srijana Subba is a Nepali film actress. She has appeared in Loot (2012), Kabaddi Kabaddi (2015), Dying Candle (2016), and Loot 2 (2017).

Personal life 
Subba is married to Padam Subba and they have one child.

Filmography

Awards and nominations

References

External links 
 

Nepali film award winners
21st-century Nepalese actresses
Living people
Year of birth missing (living people)